Natalie Stafford is a basketball player for Great Britain women's national basketball team. She was born on 8 December 1976 in Sydney, New South Wales, Australia. She was part of the squad for the 2012 Summer Olympics. Her height is 176 cm and weight is 66 kg. She has affiliated for University of Sydney, New South Wales.

References

1976 births
Living people
British women's basketball players
Basketball players at the 2012 Summer Olympics
Olympic basketball players of Great Britain
Sydney Uni Flames players